Zygopolis was a town of ancient Pontus, in the neighbourhood of Colchis mentioned by Strabo. Stephanus of Byzantium conjectures that it was in the territory of the Zygii, which, however, does not agree with Strabo's description.

Its site is unlocated.

References

Populated places in ancient Pontus
Former populated places in Turkey
Lost ancient cities and towns